Norfolkline was a European ferry operator and logistics company owned by Maersk. It provided freight ferry services on the English channel, Irish Sea, and the North Sea; and passenger ferry services on the English channel and Irish Sea; and logistics services across Europe. Norfolkline employed more than 2,200 employees in 13 countries across Europe, operating out of 35 different locations.

Norfolkline operated 18 vessels and over 550 refrigerated trailers (including 200 with dual compartment units), 1,750 dry-cargo trailers, and 1,150 swap-body trailers for intermodal freight transport. In 2006 more than 1.5 million passengers used Norfolkline's ferry services across the English channel between Dover and Dunkirk and on the Irish Sea (between Liverpool and Belfast & Liverpool and Dublin) and over 1.2 million freight movements were completed.

In July 2010, DFDS acquired Norfolkline; The Norfolkline routes and vessels were integrated into DFDS Seaways.

History
Activities started in 1961 when Dutch entrepreneur Mr. L. Remeeus founded Norfolk Lijn N.V. He operated two coasters on a regular cargo service between Great Yarmouth and Scheveningen. The first appearance of the company in the ferry business was made possible when the roll-on/roll-off vessel Duke of Holland was acquired in 1969. Mr. Remeeus sold Norfolk Lijn N.V. to Unilever in 1973 and the company was renamed Norfolk Line in 1974.

The Company operated out of Great Yarmouth with "Duke of Holland and Duke of Norfolk", operations from Great Yarmouth commenced in 1969 and were finished by 1992, when nearby Felixstowe poached the business with Norfolkline in an aim to enhance the size of its fleet, which at the time Felixstowe could accommodate but Great Yarmouth couldn't.

The operations at Great Yarmouth were located at Atlas Terminal in the area of town known as South Denes. Norfolkline's UK head office was located at Atlas House (now demolished) whilst the operator had the entire Atlas Terminal quayside, a holding yard on the other side of the road as well as other facilities around the town. It is widely rumoured, that the town's outer harbour, which was first proposed around the 1960s/1970s was the main reason for the operator pulling the plug.

It is understood that Maersk wanted to hold an ownership in the new harbour and pay partly towards it, whilst also funding improvements to major road networks to the town including the A47 and A12 as well as partly funding a new river crossing. When the town and port authority rejected this proposal as well as the issue of capacity sizing which was soon outgrowing the town's river harbour and without the outer harbour it would have been falling behind, later Norfolkline moved to Felixstowe in 1992.

The Maersk Company Ltd, subsidiary of A.P. Møller acquired Norfolk Line in 1985.

The nineties started with the merger of Norfolk Line with rail transport specialist Skandi in 1995 introducing rail freight services to the company, followed by 4 new vessels that were added to the Norfolk Line fleet (1996) and the opening of a container route between Rotterdam (Holland) to Waterford (Ireland) in 1997. The year after that the company was renamed Norfolkline and the refrigerated transport business was launched in Belfast. A second refrigerated transport location was launched in 1999 in Larkhall.

In the new millennium, the ferry division expanded with the start of a ferry route from Dover (UK) to Dunkirk (France) in 2000. Five years later Norfolkline acquired Norse Merchant Ferries, a roll-on/roll-off ferry operator on Irish Sea routes. In 2006 a new roll-on/roll-off terminal in Vlaardingen was opened, launching a new route between Vlaardingen and Felixstowe/North Killingholme Haven.

Norfolkline business
Norfolkline's business was split in two divisions, a Logistics division and a Ferry division.

Logistics division
The logistics division was focused on tailor made solutions through different industries. Norfolkline operated logistics services providing refrigerated transportation of goods by road, rail, and sea from locations across Europe with routes from/to Belgium, Denmark, the United Kingdom, Finland, France, Germany, Ireland, Italy, Norway, Sweden, Switzerland, and the Netherlands.

Ferry division
Norfolkline operated passenger and freight ferry services on the English Channel, the Irish Sea and the North Sea. Norfolkline's North Sea services carried freight only, whereas all other routes carried both lorry freight and private vehicles.  Norfolkline also carried foot passengers on some of their North Sea services. Norfolkline's ferry routes were as follows:

Birkenhead—Dublin
Dover—Dunkirk
Dublin—Heysham (Freight only)
Esbjerg—Harwich (Freight only)
Esbjerg—Immingham (Freight only)
Felixstowe—Vlaardingen (Freight only)
Gothenburg—Immingham (Freight only)
Immingham—Vlaardingen (Freight only)
Rosyth—Zeebrugge

Social and environmental responsibility
Staff of Norfolkline Larkhall raised money for Cash for Kids, a Scottish charity. ]. The company sponsored the Liverpool Irish Festival 2008. Norfolkline Irish Sea has provided financial support for Action Renewables.

Norfolkline reduced their carbon footprint by investing in environmental friendly resources, such as their recent investment of refrigerated trailers which are 92% recyclable.

Awards and recognitions
 2008 - “Best Ferry Company” by readers of Guardian.
 2007 - “Highly Recommended” in “Best Ferry Company” category of the 2007 Telegraph Travel Awards.
 2006 - winner NBCC Trophy (Netherlands British Chamber of Commerce), Anglo-Dutch award for enterprise.
 2004 - voted “Best European Crossing Operator” by readers of The Daily Telegraph and Sunday Telegraph.
 2004 - voted “Leading Cross Channel Operator” by readers of The Guardian and The Observer.

List of Norfolkline vessels
Maersk Dunkerque
Maersk Delft
Maersk Dover
Maersk Flanders
Maersk Anglia
Maersk Importer
Maersk Essex
Maersk Kent
Maersk Exporter
Maas Viking
Lagan Viking
Mersey Viking
Dublin Viking
Liverpool Viking
Saga Moon
East Express
Maersk Vlaardingen
Maersk Voyager
RR Arrow
RR Shield
Merchant Brilliant
Scottish Viking

References

External links

DFDS passenger ferry website
Norfolkline passenger ferry website
Norfolkline freight ferry website
Norfolkline logistics website
Sister Ships Maersk Vlaardingen and Voyager
History of Norfolk Line Ferries

Multinational companies headquartered in the Netherlands
Transport companies established in 1961
Shipping companies of the Netherlands
Ferry companies of the Netherlands
DFDS
Transport companies disestablished in 2010
2010 disestablishments in the Netherlands
2010 mergers and acquisitions
Dutch companies disestablished in 2010
Dutch companies established in 1961